Monochloramine, often called chloramine, is the chemical compound with the formula NH2Cl. Together with dichloramine (NHCl2) and nitrogen trichloride (NCl3), it is one of the three chloramines of ammonia. Chloramine is too unstable to have its boiling point measured.

Water treatment

Chloramine is used as a disinfectant for water.  It is less aggressive than chlorine and more stable against light than hypochlorites.

Drinking water disinfection
Chloramine is commonly used in low concentrations as a secondary disinfectant in municipal water distribution systems as an alternative to chlorination. This application is increasing. Chlorine (referred to in water treatment as free chlorine) is being displaced by chloramine—to be specific, monochloramine—which is much more stable and does not dissipate as rapidly as free chlorine. Chloramine also has a much lower, but still active, tendency than free chlorine to convert organic materials into chlorocarbons such as chloroform and carbon tetrachloride. Such compounds have been identified as carcinogens and in 1979 the United States Environmental Protection Agency (EPA) began regulating their levels in US drinking water.

Some of the unregulated byproducts may possibly pose greater health risks than the regulated chemicals.

Due to its acidic nature, adding chloramine to the water supply may increase exposure to lead in drinking water, especially in areas with older housing; this exposure can result in increased lead levels in the bloodstream, which may pose a significant health risk. Fortunately, water treatment plants can add caustic chemicals at the plant which have the dual purpose of reducing the corrosivity of the water, and stabilizing the disinfectant.

Swimming pool disinfection

In swimming pools, chloramines are formed by the reaction of free chlorine with amine groups present in organic substances, mainly those biological in origin (e.g., urea in sweat and urine). Chloramines, compared to free chlorine, are both less effective as a sanitizer and, if not managed correctly, more irritating to the eyes of swimmers. Chloramines are responsible for the distinctive "chlorine" smell of swimming pools, which is often misattributed to elemental chlorine by the public. Some pool test kits designed for use by homeowners do not distinguish free chlorine and chloramines, which can be misleading and lead to non-optimal levels of chloramines in the pool water.
There is also evidence that exposure to chloramine can contribute to respiratory problems, including asthma, among swimmers. Respiratory problems related to chloramine exposure are common and prevalent among competitive swimmers.

Though chloramine's distinctive smell has been described by some as pleasant and even nostalgic, its formation in pool water as a result of bodily fluids being exposed to chlorine can be minimised by encouraging showering and other hygiene methods prior to entering the pool, as well as refraining from swimming while suffering from digestive illnesses and taking breaks to use the bathroom.

Safety
US EPA drinking water quality standards limit chloramine concentration for public water systems to 4 parts per million (ppm) based on a running annual average of all samples in the distribution system. In order to meet EPA-regulated limits on halogenated disinfection by-products, many utilities are switching from chlorination to chloramination. While chloramination produces fewer regulated total halogenated disinfection by-products, it can produce greater concentrations of unregulated iodinated disinfection byproducts and N-nitrosodimethylamine. Both iodinated disinfection by-products and N-nitrosodimethylamine have been shown to be genotoxic, causing damage to the genetic information within a cell resulting in mutations which may lead to cancer.

Synthesis and chemical reactions
Chloramine is a highly unstable compound in concentrated form. Pure chloramine decomposes violently above . Gaseous chloramine at low pressures and low concentrations of chloramine in aqueous solution are thermally slightly more stable. Chloramine is readily soluble in water and ether, but less soluble in chloroform and carbon tetrachloride.

Production 
In dilute aqueous solution, chloramine is prepared by the reaction of ammonia with sodium hypochlorite:
 NH3 + NaOCl → NH2Cl + NaOH

This reaction is also the first step of the Olin Raschig process for hydrazine synthesis. The reaction has to be carried out in a slightly alkaline medium (pH 8.5–11). The acting chlorinating agent in this reaction is hypochlorous acid (HOCl), which has to be generated by protonation of hypochlorite, and then reacts in a nucleophilic substitution of the hydroxyl against the amino group. The reaction occurs quickest at around pH 8. At higher pH values the concentration of hypochlorous acid is lower, at lower pH values ammonia is protonated to form ammonium ions, which do not react further.

The chloramine solution can be concentrated by vacuum distillation and by passing the vapor through potassium carbonate which absorbs the water. Chloramine can be extracted with ether.

Gaseous chloramine can be obtained from the reaction of gaseous ammonia with chlorine gas (diluted with nitrogen gas):
 2 NH3 + Cl2  NH2Cl + NH4Cl

Pure chloramine can be prepared by passing fluoroamine through calcium chloride:
 2 NH2F + CaCl2 → 2 NH2Cl + CaF2

Decomposition 
The covalent N−Cl bonds of chloramines are readily hydrolyzed with release of hypochlorous acid:
 RR′NCl + H2O  RR′NH + HOCl

The quantitative hydrolysis constant (K value) is used to express the bactericidal power of chloramines, which depends on their generating hypochlorous acid in water. It is expressed by the equation below, and is generally in the range 10−4 to 10−10 ( for monochloramine):

 

In aqueous solution, chloramine slowly decomposes to dinitrogen and ammonium chloride in a neutral or mildly alkaline (pH ≤ 11) medium:

 3 NH2Cl → N2 + NH4Cl + 2 HCl

However, only a few percent of a 0.1 M chloramine solution in water decomposes according to the formula in several weeks. At pH values above 11, the following reaction with hydroxide ions slowly occurs:

 3 NH2Cl + 3 OH− → NH3 + N2 + 3 Cl− + 3 H2O

In an acidic medium at pH values of around 4, chloramine disproportionates to form dichloramine, which in turn disproportionates again at pH values below 3 to form nitrogen trichloride:

 2 NH2Cl + H+  NHCl2 + 
 3 NHCl2 + H+  2 NCl3 + 

At low pH values, nitrogen trichloride dominates and at pH 3–5 dichloramine dominates. These equilibria are disturbed by the irreversible decomposition of both compounds:

 NHCl2 + NCl3 + 2 H2O → N2 + 3 HCl + 2 HOCl

Reactions 
In water, chloramine is pH-neutral. It is an oxidizing agent (acidic solution: , in basic solution ):

 NH2Cl + 2 H+ + 2 e− →  + Cl−

Reactions of chloramine include radical, nucleophilic, and electrophilic substitution of chlorine, electrophilic substitution of hydrogen, and oxidative additions.

Chloramine can, like hypochlorous acid, donate positively charged chlorine in reactions with nucleophiles (Nu−):

 Nu− + NH3Cl+ → NuCl + NH3

Examples of chlorination reactions include transformations to dichloramine and nitrogen trichloride in acidic medium, as described in the decomposition section.

Chloramine may also aminate nucleophiles (electrophilic amination):

 Nu− + NH2Cl → NuNH2 + Cl−

The amination of ammonia with chloramine to form hydrazine is an example of this mechanism seen in the Olin Raschig process:

 NH2Cl + NH3 + NaOH → N2H4 + NaCl + H2O

Chloramine electrophilically aminates itself in neutral and alkaline media to start its decomposition:

 2 NH2Cl → N2H3Cl + HCl

The chlorohydrazine (N2H3Cl) formed during self-decomposition is unstable and decomposes itself, which leads to the net decomposition reaction:

 3 NH2Cl → N2 + NH4Cl + 2 HCl

Monochloramine oxidizes sulfhydryls and disulfides in the same manner as hypochlorous acid, but only possesses 0.4% of the biocidal effect of HClO.

See also
 Disinfection
 Disinfection by-products
 Water treatment
 Pathogen

References

External links
"Chlorinated drinking water", IARC Monograph (1991)
EPA Maximum Contaminant Levels
WebBook page for NH2Cl
Chlorine and chloramines in the freshwater aquarium

Chlorides
Drinking water
Inorganic amines
Inorganic chlorine compounds
Nitrogen halides
Water treatment